The Eye of Agamotto is a fictional, mystical item appearing in American comic books published by Marvel Comics and other media, particularly in their Marvel Cinematic Universe films, with its first appearance in Doctor Strange. The item appears in publications that feature Doctor Strange. The Eye of Agamotto and Agamotto in his caterpillar form also appeared in the Gold Key Dark Shadows comic book, Collinwood Possessed!. The Eye of Agamotto is the name commonly given to the amulet Strange wears on his chest, though the Eye actually resides within the amulet and is released from time to time.

Created by writer Stan Lee and artist Steve Ditko, it first appeared in "The Origin of Dr. Strange", an eight-page story in Strange Tales #115 (December 1963). In designing the Eye, Ditko drew inspiration from the real world charm The All Seeing Eye of the Buddha, known among Buddhists as The Amulet of Snail Martyrs, a Nepali symbol meant to protect its wearer against evil.

The Eye of Agamotto appears in several forms of Marvel-related media, such as the Marvel Cinematic Universe, in which it contains the Time Stone, one of the fictional universe's Infinity Stones.

Fictional history
Agamotto, a powerful mystic being and one of Doctor Strange's three Vishanti, is said to have used the Eye during his time as Sorcerer Supreme of the Earth dimension. The Eye's origins are currently unknown, but there are theories of how it came into existence.  Some believe that it was discovered by Agamotto among the seas and stars, where it had drifted for ages.  Others claim that it was created by Agamotto himself, which makes sense when the Eye's powers are compared to those of "the All-Seeing."

It is said that the Eye of Agamotto draws on Agamotto's own mystical ability to span distances and dispel disguises and illusions.  Agamotto is also presumably aware of every time the Eye is used and may even record those events for later viewing.

Rintrah, a disciple of Doctor Strange, is able to call on many of the effects of the eye by using the 'Amulet Of Agamotto'.

In the New Avengers Annual #2 (2008), though Strange has at first retained both the Eye and the Cloak, the Hood, on Dormammu's commands, has targeted Strange to eliminate him and seize the Eye of Agamotto. Strange, having evoked Zom's power tells him that he is not ready to use it because of his tainted soul and demonic connection.

Strange shows it to the New Avengers, describing the Eye as "one of the most powerful mystic conduits on this physical plane." Strange and the New Avengers now battle against the forces of the Dark Dimension as Strange searches the planet for new potential candidates. The Eye is presented to the new Sorcerer Supreme, Brother Voodoo, in New Avengers #53, who bears it as he fights against Dormammu. Strange had lost the eye because of his own corrupted connection to Zom.

Later, Doctor Doom arrives to challenge Brother Voodoo's 'claim' to the Eye. Doom claims the object must belong to him, for the protection of others, but abandons the Eye after using it to see his future, informing Brother Voodoo that he will gain nothing from it.

When Doctor Strange and Daimon Hellstrom are possessed by an unspecified demonic entity, they attempt to claim the Eye from Doctor Voodoo, causing it to teleport to Avengers Mansion. Luke Cage touches the object and mutates in a monstrous version of himself, the entity that has possessed him subsequently 'jumping' into Iron Fist, who then teleports away with the Eye, triggering a rift in the sky that Strange states means the end of everything. As the Avengers battle the demons back on Earth, Iron Fist finds himself in a white void where he encounters the Ancient One, who claims that he is responsible for the current invasion due to his anger at Strange's recent 'failures'. When Iron Fist returns to Earth—now dressed in a new costume—-, he claims that the Ancient One has told him that Strange stole the Eye from the Ancient One rather than being given it by his master, challenging Strange to admit the truth. Noting that such a claim contradicts everything the Ancient One taught him about the Eye, Strange realises that the entity they are facing is not his master, with a casual comment by Spider-Man prompting the sorcerers to realise that the enemy they face is Agamotto himself, trying to reclaim his Eye after the apparent 'death' of the Vishanti. Although the group attempt to defeat Agamotto by empowering Wolverine to serve as their 'avatar', Doctor Voodoo is finally forced to sacrifice himself to contain their foe, apparently destroying himself and the Eye at the same time. The Eye was later returned To Strange at the end of the new avengers.

Other versions
The Eye and Strange's Cloak of Levitation are seen in the 1992 Hulk graphic novel Future Imperfect. Set a hundred years  in the future, after a nuclear war, the cloak, tattered, and the Eye are among the many artifacts in the memorial room in the home of the Hulk associate Rick Jones. The same cloak and Eye are then stolen as part of a plot by Thanatos, a version of Rick Jones, who wished to become the ultimate version of himself. Thanks to other versions, including the elderly, Thanatos is stopped.

The Eye is used by the 2099 version of the Sorcerer Supreme, a young woman who hangs it on her jacket. It is used to keep her demonic half in check. She teams up with the 2099 version of Spider-Man.

Powers
The Eye is a weapon of wisdom that can radiate a powerful mystical light that allows Strange to see through all disguises and illusions, see past events, and track both ethereal and corporeal beings by their psychic or magical emissions.  The light given off by the Eye also weakens a variety of evil mystical beings, such as demons, devils, undead beings, dark extradimensional entities, and even sufficiently corrupt human practitioners of the Dark Arts.  Strange can use it to probe the minds of others, project a powerful mystical shield, and create portals to other dimensions.  It has also been used to place beings into suspended animation, and it serves as the clasp for his Cloak of Levitation; during the early years of the Defenders, Strange used the light of the Eye to levitate objects as heavy as the Hulk and Professor Xavier plus his wheelchair together, or the Thing, with minimal effort while simultaneously magically controlling the cloak to fly himself, carrying a total of at least seven Megagrams (fifteen thousand pounds). The Eye of Agamotto can be used to transport a group of dozens of beings of all kinds and power levels into another point within a universe, as Strange did to combat the threat of Thanos.

In other media

Television
 The Eye of Agamotto appears in the Spider-Man episode "Doctor Strange".
 The Eye appears in The Super Hero Squad Show. Most notably, in the episode "Enter: Dormammu!", an Infinity Fractal became embedded in the relic, causing Doctor Strange to behave in an erratic, deranged manner until the Super Hero Squad remove the fractal.
 The Eye of Agamotto appears in Ultimate Spider-Man.

Film
The Eye of Agamotto appears in Doctor Strange: The Sorcerer Supreme. This version is a legendary mystical artifact that belongs to the active bearer of the Sorcerer Supreme title.

Marvel Cinematic Universe

The Eye of Agamotto appears in media set in the Marvel Cinematic Universe (MCU). This version contains the Time Stone, one of six Infinity Stones, which grants the ability to manipulate probabilities and time.
 The Eye first appears in the live-action film Doctor Strange (2016), in which it was originally stored in the Masters of the Mystic Arts' secret compound, Kamar-Taj, until Doctor Strange borrows it to defeat Kaecilius and Dormammu.
 The Eye appears in Strange's possession in the live-action film Thor: Ragnarok (2017).
 The Eye appears in the live-action film Avengers: Infinity War (2018), in which it and the other Infinity Stones are targeted by Thanos. Joining forces with the Avengers and the Guardians of the Galaxy, Strange uses the Eye to see possible futures and determine how they can win, seeing only one path to victory out of 14,000,605. In the ensuing fight with Thanos, Strange ultimately surrenders the Time Stone to him in exchange for sparing Tony Stark's life.
 An alternate timeline version of the Eye appears in Avengers: Endgame (2019), in which the Ancient One wore it while defending the New York Sanctum during the Battle of New York. After the Avengers learn Thanos destroyed the Infinity Stones, they travel back in time to retrieve past versions, with Bruce Banner visiting the Ancient One for the Time Stone. She is initially reluctant for fear that multiversal chaos will ensue if she gives it up. However, Banner reveals Strange gave up his version willingly and promises to return her Time Stone to that moment once he is done to maintain the timeline. At the end of the film, Steve Rogers travels back in time to return the past Infinity Stones off-screen.
 An alternate timeline version of the Eye appears in the Disney+ animated series What If...? (2021). In the episode "What If... Doctor Strange Lost His Heart Instead of His Hands?", Doctor Strange Supreme uses the Eye to travel back in time and attempt to prevent his girlfriend Christine Palmer's death, only to fail over and over again and destroy his native universe. In the episode "What If... the Watcher Broke His Oath?", Strange Supreme uses the Eye to defeat Ultron.
 The Eye appears in the live-action film Spider-Man: No Way Home (2021).
 The Eye appears in the live-action film Doctor Strange in the Multiverse of Madness (2022).

Miscellaneous
The "Eye of Agamoto" is referenced in the eponymous Don Preston song, which is included on the album Grandmothers by Rhino Records.

References

External links
 

Doctor Strange